The New Economy refers to the ongoing development of the American economic system.  It evolved from the notions of the classical economy via the transition from a manufacturing-based economy to a service-based economy, and has been driven by new technology and innovations.  This popular use of the term emerged during the dot-com bubble of the late 1990s, where high growth, low inflation, and high employment of this period led to optimistic predictions and flawed business plans.

Origins
A 1983 cover article in Time, "The New Economy", described the transition from heavy industry to a new technology based economy. By 1997, Newsweek was referring to the "new economy" in many of its articles.

After a nearly 25-year period of unprecedented growth, the United States experienced a much discussed economic slowdown beginning in 1972. However, around 1995, U.S. economic growth accelerated, driven by faster productivity growth. From 1972 to 1995, the growth rate of output per hour, a measure of labor productivity, had only averaged around one-percent per year. But by the mid 1990s, growth became much faster: 2.65 percent from 1995–99. America also experienced increased employment and decreasing inflation. The economist Robert J. Gordon referred to this as a Goldilocks economy—-the result of five positive "shocks"—–"the two traditional shocks (food-energy and imports) and the three new shocks (computers, medical care, and measurement)"

Other economists pointed to the ripening benefits of the computer age, being realized after a delay much like that associated with the delayed benefits of electricity shortly after the turn of the twentieth century. Gordon contended in 2000, that the benefits of computers were marginal or even negative for the majority of firms, with their benefits being consolidated in the computer hardware and durable goods manufacturing sectors, which only represent a relatively small segment of the economy. His method relied on applying considerably sized gains in the business cycle to explain aggregate productivity growth.

According to the generally unaccepted Kondratiev wave theory of economy growth, the "new economy" is a current Kondratiev wave which will end after a 50-year period in the 2040s. Its innovative basis includes Internet, nanotechnologies, telematics and bionics.

Dot-coms
In the financial markets, the term has been associated with the Dot-com bubble. This included the emergence of the NASDAQ as a rival to the New York Stock Exchange, a high rate of IPOs, the rise of Dot-com stocks over established firms, and the prevalent use of tools such as stock options. In the wider economy the term has been associated with practices such as outsourcing, business process outsourcing and business process re-engineering.

At the same time, there was a lot of investment in companies in  the technology sector. Stock shares rose dramatically. A lot of start-ups were created and the stock value was very high where floated. Newspapers and business leaders were starting to talk of new business models. Some even claimed that the old laws of economics did not apply anymore and that new laws had taken their place. They also claimed that improvements in computer hardware and software would dramatically change the future, and that information is the most important value in the new economy.

Some, such as Joseph Stiglitz and Blake Belding, have suggested that a lot of investment in information technology, especially in software and unused fibre optics, was useless. However, this may be too harsh a judgment, given that U.S. investment in information technology has remained relatively strong since 2002.  While there may have been some overinvestment, productivity research shows that much of the investment has been useful in raising output.

The recession of 2001 disproved many of the more extreme predictions made during the boom years, and gave credence to Gordon's minimization of computers' contributions. However, subsequent research  strongly suggests that productivity growth has been stimulated by heavy investment in information and communication technology.

New kinds of companies

 Online retailers
 Crowdfunding web sites
 Mass customization manufacturers – 3D printing, design-your-own web sites for sneakers, clothing
 Social media
 Sharing economy companies
 Bicycle sharing system
 Carsharing and short-term rental companies such as Zipcar
 Ridesharing companies such as Lyft, Uber, Haxi, and Bridj
 Garden sharing
 Peer-to-peer lending of money
 Short term property rental companies such as Airbnb
 Online media companies, such as Netflix
 Online dating services
 Online advertising, from free classifieds like craigslist to paid-placement like Google AdWords

See also
 Asset-based economy
 Long tail
 Knowledge economy
 Information revolution
 Deindustrialization
 Post-industrial economy

References

Further reading
 Georg Erber & Harald Hagemann: "The New Economy in a Growth Crisis" 
 After the New Economy, by Doug Henwood (2003) 
 The New Economy in a Transatlantic Perspective: Spaces of Innovation, ed. Kurt Hübner, Routledge Studies in Governance and Change in the Global Era, Routledge, 2005.]
 Richard Sennett: The Culture of the New Capitalism, Yale University Press, 2006.
 "The Roaring Nineties – A new history of the world's most prosperous decade," Joseph E. Stiglitz, 2003.
 Michel Volle, e–conomie, Economica, 2000, 
 Laffey, D. (2006). The Rise and Fall of the Dot Com Enterprises. In: Burke, A., ed. Modern Perspectives on Entrepreneurship. Ireland: Senate Hall Academic Publishing, ch. 6.
 Porter, M. (2001). Strategy and the Internet. Harvard Business Review; Mar 2001, Vol. 79, Issue 3, pp. 62–78.

Capitalist systems
Economies